Trichomelanauster albomaculatus is a species of beetle in the family Cerambycidae, and the only species in the genus Trichomelanauster. It was described by Stephan von Breuning in 1983.

References

Lamiini
Beetles described in 1983